Pru District is a former district that was located in Brong-Ahafo Region (now currently in Bono East Region), Ghana. Originally it was formerly part of the then-larger Atebubu District on 10 March 1989, until the northern part was split off to create Pru District; thus the remaining part has been renamed as Atebubu-Amantin District, which it was elevated to municipal district assembly status on 15 March 2018 to become Atebubu-Amantin Municipal District. However on 15 March 2018, it was split off into two new districts: Pru East District (capital: Yeji) and Pru West District (capital: Prang).  The district assembly was located in the east central part of Brong-Ahafo Region (now east central part of Bono East Region) and had Yeji as its capital town.

List of settlements

Sources
 
 District: Pru
 19 New Districts Created, 20 November 2003.

References

External links
 https://www.ghanaweb.com

Brong-Ahafo Region

2003 establishments in Ghana

Former districts of Ghana